Euphoria Season 2 Official Score (From the HBO Original Series) is the second soundtrack by British musician Labrinth, consisting of the score for the second season of the HBO teen drama Euphoria. It was released by HBO and Columbia Records on 22 April 2022.

Consisting primarily of instrumental tracks, the album features guest vocals from Angus Cloud, Zendaya and Dominic Fike. It features the previously released singles "I'm Tired", "Elliot's Song", and "Mount Everest" which peaked at numbers 49, 91, and 58 on the UK Singles Chart, respectively. The first two were featured on the season two soundtrack and the latter song was also featured on the season 1 score as well as Labrinth's 2019 album Imagination & the Misfit Kid.

Promotion 
A music video for the single "Mount Everest" was released to coincide with the release of the score. It premiered on Labrinth's official YouTube channel on April 22.

Track listing

Charts

Release history

References 

2022 soundtrack albums
Labrinth albums
Television soundtracks
Euphoria (TV series)
Columbia Records soundtracks
Albums produced by Labrinth